Ross Stein is a scientist emeritus at the U.S. Geological Survey in Menlo Park, California. Stein is also cofounder and CEO of Temblor, a startup enabling people to learn their seismic hazard and determine steps to reduce their risk.

Education
He graduated magna cum laude from Brown University in 1975, received a Ph.D. from Stanford University in 1980 and was an Observatory Post-Doctoral Fellow at Columbia University in 1981.

Career
Stein is a Fellow of the American Geophysical Union (AGU) and the Geological Society of America, edited the Journal of Geophysical Research during 1986–1989 and chaired AGU's Board of Journal Editors in 2004–2006. He was a visiting professor at Institut de Physique du Globe (Paris and Strasbourg) and Ecole Normale Supérieure in 1989, 1993, 1999, and 2008. Stein co-founded and chairs the Scientific Board of the Global Earthquake Model (the GEM Foundation), a public-private partnership building a worldwide seismic risk model.

Recognition
During 1993–2003, the Science Citation Index reported that Stein was the second-most-cited author in earthquake science. He received the Eugene M. Shoemaker Distinguished Achievement Award of the USGS in 2000, the Excellence in Outreach Award of the Southern California Earthquake Center in 1999, and the Outstanding Contributions and Cooperation in Geoscience Award from NOAA in 1991.

He presented the Francis Birch Lecture of the AGU in 1996, the Frontiers of Geophysics Lecture of the AGU in 2001, C. Thomas Crough Memorial Lecture of Purdue University, Andrew C. Lawson Lecture of U.C. Berkeley, and the Condon Public Lecture of Oregon State University in 2004, and gave the Validus Re Distinguished Lecture in 2007. In 2005, he was keynote speaker at the Smithsonian Institution for the Presidential Awards for Excellence in Mathematics and Science Teaching. Stein led non-proprietary seismic hazards investigations for Swiss Re, on Istanbul (2000) and Tokyo (2006).

Media
Stein appeared in the Emmy award-nominated documentary, Killer Quake (NOVA, 1995); the four-part Great Quakes series (Discovery Channel, 1997–2001); Earthquake Storms (BBC, 2003); and the IMAX film, Forces of Nature (National Geographic Society, 2004), which he helped to write and animate. Forces was awarded best feature film of the 2004 Large Format Cinema Association Film Festival, best film and best educational film of the 2005 Giant Screen Theater Association, and Grand Prize of the 2005 La Géode International Large Format Film Festival.

Selected publications
 R. S. Stein, G. C. P. King and J. Lin, Stress triggering of earthquakes: evidence for the 1994 M=6.7 Northridge, California, shock, Annali di Geofisica, 37, pp. 1799–1805, 1995
 R. S. Stein, Earthquakes: Characteristic or haphazard? (News and Views), Nature, 378, pp. 443–444, 1995
 R. S. Stein, Northridge Earthquake: Which fault and what next?, Nature, 373, pp. 388–389, 1995.
 R. S. Stein, Comment on "The impact of refraction correction on leveling interpretation in Southern California", by William E. Strange, J. Geohys. Res., 89, pp. 559–561, 1984
 R. S. Stein, Coalinga's caveat, EOS, American Geophysical Union Transaction, 65, pp. 791–795, 1984
 R. S. Stein, Aerodynamics of the Pterosaur wing, Science (letter), 191, pp. 898, 1976

References

United States Geological Survey personnel
American geophysicists
Living people
People from Menlo Park, California
Fellows of the Geological Society of America
Fellows of the American Geophysical Union
Year of birth missing (living people)
Brown University alumni
Stanford University alumni